Jim Osborn (13 February 1935 – 20 March 2008) was an Australian cricketer. He played in two first-class matches for South Australia between 1953 and 1955.

See also
 List of South Australian representative cricketers

References

External links
 

1935 births
2008 deaths
Australian cricketers
South Australia cricketers
Cricketers from Adelaide